Victoria Leonardo Mason (born February 16, 1990) is an American mixed martial artist who competes in the Flyweight division of the Ultimate Fighting Championship.

Background

Born in the Pomona section of Galloway Township, New Jersey, Leonardo moved with her family to Shreveport, Louisiana when she was 4 years old. Studying Italian in high school helped Leonardo discover her love for foreign languages, but she switched to Spanish for her field of study in college. She was one of the last students out of Louisiana State University in Shreveport to major in a foreign language before the program was discontinued. With her degree, she teaches Spanish at Calvary Baptist Academy.

Mixed martial arts career

Early career & Invicta
After starting her career in 2018 winning both her fights for Legacy Fighting Alliance, Victoria made her Invicta Fighting Championships against Miranda Maverick  on September 1, 2018 at Invicta FC 31: Jandiroba vs. Morandin. She lost via a submission.

She picked up three straight submission wins, against Monica Medina at Gulf Coast MMA 2, against Jamie Milanowski at Invicta FC 34: Porto vs. Gonzalez, and against Malin Hermansson at Bellator 218.

On August 9, 2019, Leonardo faced Stephanie Geltmacher at Invicta FC 36. She won the fight via unanimous decision.

On February 7, 2020, Leonardo faced Erin Blanchfield at Invicta FC 39. In the second round Leonardo got dropped with a head kick, getting stopped by stoppage.

Victoria faced Liz Tracy at Invicta FC 42: Cummins vs. Zappitella on September 17, 2020. She won the fight via unanimous decision.

Leonardo competed at Dana White's Contender Series 36 where she fought and won against Chelsea Hackett on November 17, 2020 for an UFC contract.

Ultimate Fighting Championship

Victoria was scheduled to face fellow newcomer Natalia Silva on January 20, 2021 at  UFC on ESPN 20. Silva pulled out due to a fractured ulna and was replaced by fellow newcomer Manon Fiorot. She lost the fight via TKO in round two.

Leonardo faced Melissa Gatto on August 7, 2021 at UFC 265. She lost the fight via technical knockout in round two after the doctor stopped the fight between rounds two and three due to an arm injury.

Leonardo faced Mandy Böhm  on July 23, 2022, at UFC Fight Night 208. She won the fight via unanimous decision.

Mixed martial arts record

|Win
|align=center|9–4
|Mandy Böhm
|Decision (unanimous)
|UFC Fight Night: Blaydes vs. Aspinall 
|
|align=center|3
|align=center|5:00
|London, England
|
|-
|Loss
|align=center|8–4
|Melissa Gatto
|TKO (doctor stoppage)
|UFC 265 
|
|align=center|2
|align=center|5:00
|Houston, Texas, United States
|
|-
|Loss
|align=center|8–3
|Manon Fiorot
|TKO (head kick and punches)
|UFC on ESPN: Chiesa vs. Magny
|
|align=center|2
|align=center|4:08
|Abu Dhabi, United Arab Emirates
|
|-
| Win
| align=center|8–2
| Chelsea Hackett
| TKO (punches)
| Dana White's Contender Series 36
| 
| align=center| 2
| align=center| 4:41
| Las Vegas, Nevada, United States
|
|-
| Win
| align=center|7–2
| Liz Tracy
|Decision (unanimous)
| Invicta FC 42: Cummins vs. Zappitella
| 
| align=center| 4
| align=center| 1:20
| Kansas City, Kansas, United States
| 
|-
| Loss
| align=center|6–2
| Erin Blanchfield
| KO (head kick and punches)
| Invicta FC 39: Frey vs. Cummins II
| 
| align=center| 2
| align=center| 2:06
| Kansas City, Kansas, United States
|
|-
| Win
| align=center| 6–1
| Stephanie Geltmacher
|Decision (unanimous)
|Invicta FC 36: Sorenson vs. Young
|
|align=center|3
|align=center|5:00
|Kansas City, Kansas, United States
| 
|-
| Win
| align=center| 5–1
| Malin Hermansson
|  Submission (armbar)
| Bellator 218
| 
| align=center| 1
| align=center| 4:49
| Thackerville, Oklahoma, United States
| 
|-
| Win
| align=center| 4–1
| Jamie Milanowski
| Submission (rear-naked choke)
| Invicta FC 34: Porto vs. Gonzalez
| 
| align=center| 1
| align=center| 2:45
| Kansas City, Missouri, United States
| 
|-
| Win
| align=center| 3–1
| Monica Medina
| Submission (rear-naked choke)
| Gulf Coast MMA 2
| 
| align=center| 2
| align=center| 2:14
| Biloxi, Mississippi, United States
| 
|-
| Loss
| align=center| 2–1
| Miranda Maverick
| Submission (armbar)
| Invicta FC 31: Jandiroba vs. Morandin
| 
| align=center| 1
| align=center| 3:26
| Kansas City, Missouri, United States
| 
|-
| Win
| align=center| 2–0
| Salina Rowland
| Decision (unanimous)
|LFA 46
|
|align=center|3
|align=center|5:00
|Newport News, Virginia, United States
|
|-
| Win
| align=center| 1–0
| Hailey Cowan
| Submission (rear-naked choke)
|LFA 40
| 
| align=center| 1
| align=center| 4:27
| Dallas, Texas, United States
|

See also 
 List of current UFC fighters
 List of female mixed martial artists

References

External links 
  
 

1990 births
Living people
American female mixed martial artists
Flyweight mixed martial artists
Ultimate Fighting Championship female fighters
Louisiana State University Shreveport alumni
People from Galloway Township, New Jersey
People from Shreveport, Louisiana
21st-century American women